Ust-Muya (Muiayn Adag) is a rural locality (a settlement) in Muysky District, Republic of Buryatia, Russia. The population was 632 in 2010. There are 14 streets.

Geography 
Muya is the nearest rural locality.

References 

Rural localities in Muysky District